Sakura was a  of the Imperial Japanese Navy, built under the 1910 Programme as a 2nd Class destroyer.

Design
Sakura and her sister ship  were at first planned to be large ocean-going vessels however due to financial problems they were redesigned to a smaller type. Unlike the preceding , which was powered by Parsons turbines, Tachibana was installed with vertical expansion engines.

Service
The ship, built at the Maizuru Naval Arsenal, was launched in 1911, completed in 1912, and entered service shortly afterward. After 20 years of service, Sakura was decommissioned in 1932 and scrapped in 1933.

References

 Conway's All the World's Fighting Ships 1922–1946

Sakura-class destroyers
1912 ships
Ships built by Maizuru Naval Arsenal